Brickplayer was a British construction toy with four sizes of sets (1 to 4) made by J. W. Spear of Enfield in North London, later supplementary sets like a Farmyard version were introduced. They were designed in the same scale as '0' gauge model railways (1:48 scale). The preference for 'HO' scale railways and the easy to use Lego type plastic toys saw it disappear by the mid-1960s. Its popularity suffered due to its complexity and dated pre-war Metroland style houses.

The sets comprised baseboards, terracotta bricks and lintels, plastic or metal door and window frames, card doors and roofing. The bricks were about 1 inch long in scale proportion to regular house bricks. Building plans were accurate architect's blue prints. A limited amount of internal accessories (furniture and fittings), for bathrooms, bedrooms, kitchens, living rooms and even studies (offices), are available in 1:48 scale from some Doll's House accessory suppliers in UK and the USA - though most of these are similar enough to have originated in the same factory. 

Buildings were constructed on allegedly waterproof waxed card bases. The bricks etc. were stuck together with a mortar made from a mixture of flour and chalk powder. It required a great amount of skill to erect buildings accurately, very time-consuming and beyond the patience of most of the children it was aimed at (8 to 14 years). Especially so in cold houses (as most British homes then were) it would take several days for the building to 'set'. Reusing the components involved a process of dunking the entire model in a large bowl of warm water. After the model fell apart the bricks and plaster pieces required lengthy rinsing to remove all organic traces to prevent mould growing on them.

When well made, models were very realistic and many high road estate agents (realtors) would place a model or two in their shop windows.

External links
 https://web.archive.org/web/20150411143536/http://www.brickplayer.co.uk/history

Scale modeling
Clay toys